Parliamentary elections were held in Latvia on 3 October 1998. The People's Party emerged as the largest party in the Saeima, winning 24 of the 100 seats.

Results

Aftermath
Initially, a coalition government was formed between Latvian Way, For Fatherland and Freedom, the Social Democratic Alliance and the New Party. This enjoyed a parliamentary majority with 60 out of the 100 MPs. However, within six months of the coalition forming, the Social Democratic Alliance left the government, leaving it with just 46 MPs, wiping out its parliamentary majority. As a result, a new government was formed with the addition of the People's Party. This enjoyed a large parliamentary majority, with 70 out of the 100 MPs.

References

Parliamentary elections in Latvia
Latvia
1998 in Latvia